opened in Nara, Japan, in 1983. It moved to a new building in 1999. The Centre is involved in the excavation, investigation, preservation, and promotion of the area's archaeological heritage, and operates an exhibition hall.

See also
 Nara National Museum
 Nara National Research Institute for Cultural Properties
 List of Historic Sites of Japan (Nara)
 List of Cultural Properties of Japan - historical materials (Nara)
 List of Cultural Properties of Japan - archaeological materials (Nara)
 Heijō Palace

References

External links
  Nara Municipal Buried Cultural Properties Research Centre

Museums in Nara, Nara
Archaeological museums in Japan
Museums established in 1983
1983 establishments in Japan